WSOF (89.9 FM) is a Christian radio–formatted radio station licensed to Madisonville, Kentucky, United States. The station is currently owned by Madisonville Baptist Temple Inc. WSOF serves as the flagship station of the Light & Truth Radio Network, which consists of an additional 4 full-power FM stations across Western Kentucky, West Tennessee, and Southern Illinois. The station's transmitter is located at the church on Island Ford Road (KY 281) on the northeast side of Madisonville.

History
WSOF went on-the-air in February 1977 as a ministry of Island Ford Baptist Church. At its start, the station aired programming 18 hours a day. In 2005, IFBC purchased WAJJ in McKenzie, Tennessee. In November 2021, WSOF applied for three construction permits for new non-commercial stations. All of them would be granted, with the three stations launching by 2023.

Satellite stations
In addition to its primary signal from Madisonville, WSOF is relayed on four full-power stations and one translator across Western Kentucky, West Tennessee, and Southern Illinois:

References

External links

SOF (FM)
Radio stations established in 1980
1980 establishments in Kentucky